Olga Hepnarová (30 June 1951 – 12 March 1975) was a Czechoslovak rampage killer, who on 10 July 1973, killed eight people with a truck in Prague. Hepnarová was convicted and sentenced to death, and was executed in 1975, the last woman executed in Czechoslovakia.

Background 

Olga Hepnarová was born on 30 June 1951, in Prague, to Czech parents. Her father was a bank clerk and her mother was a dentist. Hepnarová was an average child, but later developed psychiatric problems, which manifested in an inability to communicate with people. In 1964 she attempted suicide by overdosing on her medication. She spent a year in a psychiatric ward at a hospital in Opařany, where she was beaten and abused after an attempted escape. She was declared "neither homosexual, nor heterosexual" by the specialists, and no mental illness was diagnosed. Hepnarová later worked at various jobs but was usually fired shortly after being hired, including when she was trained as a bookbinder in Prague and then worked in Cheb for a year before returning to Prague. She ended up working as a truck driver. Gradually she lost contact with her family, especially her father and older sister. She bought a cabin that she had brought to the village of Oleško, from where she commuted to work. She later sold the cabin and bought a Trabant car with the money she had received.

Arson attack 
Hepnarová’s father inherited a farm in the village of Zábrodí, which the family used for recreation. On the morning of 7 August 1970, using a bottle of gasoline, Hepnarová set fire to the door in the living area of the building. She hoped that the fire would reach the hayloft via a dormer and destroy the homestead. Her sister and two tenants - a married couple over the age of 75 - were asleep in the house at the time. They woke up and managed to extinguish the fire in time. The final damage was only 50 Kčs. Hepnarová was not suspected of the crime. She had approached the farm on foot at night after taking a taxi from Náchod. She confessed to the act during a psychiatric examination in 1973. As a motive, she stated that the property had become the cause of money disputes between her parents.

Truck attack 

Hepnarová began planning the truck attack about six months in advance. She believed all people were trying to hurt her. She said that she had been beaten up on the street for no reason, and no one helped her. She refused to become an unknown suicide, and wanted to be remembered.

Her original plans included derailment of an express train or detonation of an explosive in a room full of people, but she decided that these were too technically demanding and instead decided on a mass shooting: she planned to obtain an automatic firearm and fire on people on Wenceslas Square. But she changed her mind about this option also: she was afraid that she might be immediately killed, and finding such a weapon also seemed difficult. Eventually she decided to use a vehicle as her weapon.

From 11 January to 10 July 1973, Hepnarová lived in room 502 in what is now Penzion Malešice, which served as a hostel for the Prague Communications business. On 9 July, she left for a last look at her cottage, and then abandoned her Trabant car, to which she was strongly attached. The next day, on 10 July, she successfully completed a test drive to demonstrate that she was able to control the specific type of truck she wanted to rent.

At 1:30 p.m., Hepnarová drove her Praga RN truck from the Defenders' of Peace (today Milada Horáková) to the Strossmayer Square (Strossmayerovo náměstí) in the Prague 7 district, where she drove her truck onto the sidewalk and into a group of about 25 people who were waiting for a tram. After the vehicle spontaneously stopped, witnesses tried to help her because they thought she had lost control of the vehicle due to a technical defect. However, Hepnarová immediately admitted that she had intentionally rammed into the crowd. Three people died immediately, three more died later the same day, two within a few days (all aged from 60 to 79), and 12 people were injured but survived.

Before the attack, Hepnarová had sent a letter to two newspapers, Svobodné slovo and Mladý svět, explaining her actions as revenge for the hatred she felt was directed against her by her family and the world. The letter was received two days after the murder.

Arrest and conviction 

During the investigation, Hepnarová confirmed her intention was to kill as many people as possible. Psychology experts found her fully aware of her actions, and she expressed no regret. She planned her actions, as she took into account that the ground sloped down to the tram stop, which allowed her to gain speed for the maximum death toll. The attack was her second attempt, as she felt there were not enough people on her first run. Hepnarová demanded to be executed. On 6 April 1974, Hepnarová was sentenced to death for murder by the City Court. The sentence was affirmed by higher instance courts and the Supreme Court re-qualified the sentence to public endangerment with the same penalty to be upheld. After several psychiatric examinations Hepnarová was deemed criminally responsible for her actions, and the Prime Minister of Czechoslovakia, Lubomír Štrougal, refused to grant her a pardon.

Execution 

Hepnarová was executed by short-drop hanging on 12 March 1975 at Pankrác Prison in Prague. She was the last woman executed in Czechoslovakia, and one of the last by the use of short-drop hanging. There are disputes over how Hepnarová faced death. Some reports say she was calm, while others say she became hysterical and started screaming and begging for her life, and that the guards had to drag her to the gallows.

Literature

In 1991, Bohumil Hrabal published Ponorné říčky, in which he describes the remorse felt by an executioner from Pankrác for sending a "beautiful lady" called Olga to the gallows.

Oprátka za osm mrtvých by Roman Cílek (2001) is about Hepnarová, and contains a collection of contemporary documents.

Film
I, Olga Hepnarová is a 2016 Czech-Polish drama film directed by Tomáš Weinreb and Petr Kazda. It was shown in the Panorama section at the 66th Berlin International Film Festival.

See also
 Vehicle-ramming attack

References

1951 births
1975 deaths
Massacres in the Czech Republic
Executed Czechoslovak women
Executed mass murderers
Czechoslovak mass murderers
Czechoslovak female murderers
Czechoslovak people convicted of murder
People convicted of murder by Czechoslovakia
People executed by the Czechoslovak Socialist Republic by hanging
Murders by motor vehicle
People from Prague
Vehicular rampage in Europe
Bisexual women